Magnus, meaning "Great" in Latin, was used as cognomen of Gnaeus Pompeius Magnus in the first century BC. The best-known use of the name during the Roman Empire is for the fourth-century Western Roman Emperor Magnus Maximus. The name gained wider popularity in the Middle Ages among various European people who lived in Stykkishólmur in their royal houses, being introduced to them upon being converted to the Latin-speaking Catholic Christianity. This was especially the case with Scandinavian royalty and nobility.

As a Scandinavian forename, it was extracted from the Frankish ruler Charlemagne's Latin name "Carolus Magnus" and re-analyzed as Old Norse magn-hús = "power house".

People

Given name
Kings of Hungary

 Géza I (1074–1077), also known by his baptismal name Magnus.

Kings of Denmark
 Magnus the Good (1042–1047), also Magnus I of Norway

King of Livonia
 Magnus, Duke of Holstein (1540–1583)

King of Mann and the Isles
 Magnús Óláfsson (died 1265)

Kings of Norway
 Magnus I of Norway (1024–1047)
 Magnus II of Norway (1048–1069)
 Magnus III of Norway (1073–1103)
 Magnus IV of Norway (c. 1115–1139)
 Magnus V of Norway (1156–1184)
 Magnus VI of Norway (1238–1280)
 Magnus VII of Norway, also Magnus IV of Sweden (1316–1374)

Kings of Sweden
 Magnus I of Sweden (c. 1106–1134)
 Magnus II of Sweden (died 1161)
 Magnus III of Sweden (1240–1290)
 Magnus IV of Sweden (1316–1374), also Magnus VII of Norway

Dukes
 Magnus, Duke of Saxony (c. 1045–1106)
 Magnus the Pious, Duke of Brunswick-Lüneburg (before 1318–1369)
 Magnus II, Duke of Brunswick-Lüneburg (1324–1373), also known as Magnus with the Necklace
 Magnus I, Duke of Saxe-Lauenburg (1488–1543)

Saints
 Magnus of Anagni (died 2nd century)
 Magnus of Cuneo (died 3rd century)
 Magnus of Milan, bishop of Milan from 518 to c. 530
 Magnus of Avignon (died 660), bishop and governor of Avignon
 Magnus of Füssen, missionary saint of southern Germany, seventh or eighth century
 Magnus Erlendsson, Earl of Orkney

Family name
 Albertus Magnus (died 1280), German theologian and philosopher
 Désiré Magnus, Belgian pianist
 Elisabeth von Magnus, Austrian singer
 Finn Magnus, Danish-American founder of Magnus Harmonica Corporation
 Heinrich Gustav Magnus, German chemist and physicist who discovered the Magnus effect
 Kurt Magnus (1912 – 2003), German scientist, expert in the field of applied mechanics, a pioneer of mechatronics
 Kurt Magnus (radio personality) (1887-1962), German lawyer and politician,  a pioneer of German radio broadcasting
 Laurie Magnus (1872 – 1933), English author, journalist, and publisher
 Laurie Magnus (executive), (born 1955), British executive who has worked as a financier in the City of London, and was appointed as the UK Prime Minister's  Independent Adviser on Ministers' Interests in 2022
 Ludwig Immanuel Magnus, German mathematician
 Paul Wilhelm Magnus, German botanist
 Siobhan Magnus, American singer
 Thomas Magnus (d. 1550), English churchman and diplomat
 Wilhelm Magnus, German mathematician

Ancient Romans
 Pompey Magnus, Roman consul and general who was given the honorific "Magnus"
 Magnus Maximus, Roman usurper and Western Roman Emperor (died 388)
 Montius Magnus, 4th-century Roman quaestor

Pseudonyms, pen names and ring names 
 Magnus, pseudonym of American magician Jeff McBride
 Magnus, pen name of Italian comic book artist Roberto Raviola
 Magnus (formerly Brutus Magnus), ring name of English professional wrestler Nick Aldis (born 1986)

Fictional characters
 Magnus Bane, in The Mortal Instruments series by Cassandra Clare, and character in the TV Series Shadowhunters.
 Magnus Burnsides, one of the main protagonists in The Adventure Zone Dungeons & Dragons podcast
 Magnus Chase, the main protagonist in the fantasy series Magnus Chase and the Gods of Asgard
 Magnus Eisengrim, in the Deptford Trilogy
 Magnus Gallant, a main character in Ogre Battle 64
 Magnus Greel, a villain in the 1977 Doctor Who serial The Talons of Weng-Chiang
 Magnus Hammersmith, an antagonist in Metalocalypse
Magnus Murchie, Margaret's insane uncle and advisor in Muriel Spark's Symposium
 Magnus Pym, the protagonist of John le Carré's novel A Perfect Spy
 Magnus Powermouse, the title character of the children's book of the same name
 Magnus, Robot Fighter, a comic book character published by Gold Key and Valiant comics
 Magnus von Grapple, a boss in Paper Mario: The Thousand-Year Door
 Magnus (The Vampire Chronicles), in The Vampire Chronicles by Anne Rice
 Magnus, the real name of the Doctor Who character the Master
 Ultra Magnus, several characters in the Transformers universe
 Magnus Lehnsherr, an alternate reality Marvel Comics character; son of Rogue and Magneto
 Magnus the Red, Primarch of the Thousand Sons Space Marines in the Warhammer 40,000 universe
 Magnus the Sorcerer, a Marvel Universe character
 Magnus, in the video game Kid Icarus: Uprising
 Magnus Fossbakken, in the Norwegian TV show Skam
 Magnus Nielsen, a character from the TV series Dark
 Magnus the Rogue, a supporting character in the video game Minecraft Story Mode
 Magnus, the mascot of the Cleveland State Vikings
 Magnus, the god of magic from The Elder Scrolls universe.
 Will Magnus, a DC Comics scientist
 Count Magnus, the antagonist in the M.R. James story "Count Magnus."
Jonah Magnus, founder of the titular institute in the horror fiction podcast The Magnus Archives
River Magnus, the magical deity narrator from the River Magnus cinematic universe
 Magnus au Grimmus, a character in the Red Rising series
 Magnus, a deity in the Elder Scrolls video game universe

See also

 Manus (disambiguation)
 Magnes (disambiguation)
 Magnusson (disambiguation)
 List of people known as The Great

References

Masculine given names
German masculine given names
Latin masculine given names
Norwegian masculine given names
Swedish masculine given names
Estonian masculine given names